The Innocence is a 2019 Spanish drama film directed by Lucía Alemany, starring Carmen Arrufat and Laia Marull.

The film was nominated for two Goya Awards.

Cast
 Carmen Arrufat as Lis
 Laia Marull as Soledad
 Sergi López as Catalano
 Joel Bosqued as Néstor
 Estelle Orient as Sara
 Laura Fernández as Rocío

Production
"One of the requirements that I wanted from Lis was that she had big tits," Lucía Alemany said in reference to the main character. "Because there is something there, in that 'two days ago I was a girl, and right now I have something that is sexually super attractive'".

Reception
The Innocence received positive reviews from film critics.

Awards

|-
| align = "center" rowspan = "9" | 2019 || rowspan = "9" | 2nd Valencian Audiovisual Awards || colspan = "2" | Best Film ||  || rowspan = "9" |  
|-
| Best Director || Lucia Alemany ||  
|-
| Best Actress || Carmen Arrufat || 
|-
| Best Supporting Actress || Laia Marull || 
|-
| Best Supporting Actor || Sergi López ||  
|-
| Best Art Direction || Asier Musitu, Bea Toro || 
|-
| Best Costume Design || Giovanna Ribes || 
|-
| Best Editing and Post-Production || Juliana Montañés || 
|-
| Best Sound || Carlos Lidón, Dani Zacarías || 
|-
| align = "center" rowspan = "10" | 2020
| rowspan=1 | 7th Feroz Awards
| Best Supporting Actress
| Laia Marull
|  || 
|-
| rowspan = "7" | 12th Gaudí Awards || colspan = "2" | Best Catalan-language Film ||  || rowspan = "7" | 
|-
| Best Direction || Lucía Alemany || 
|-
| Best Screenplay || Lucía Alemany, Laia Soler ||  
|-
| Best Actress || Carmen Arrufat || 
|-
| Best Supporting Actress || Laia Marull || 
|-
| Best Editing || Juliana Montañés || 
|-
| Best Makeup and Hairstyles || Natalia Montoya || 
|-
| rowspan=2 | 34th Goya Awards
| Best New Actress
| Carmen Arrufat
|  || rowspan = "2" | 
|-
| Best Original Song
| "Allí en la arena" by Toni M. Mir
| 
|}

References

External links
 
 

2019 films
2010s Spanish-language films
2010s Spanish films